The Gangshan Water Tower is a historical water tower in Gangshan District, Kaohsiung, Taiwan.

History
Gangshan Street, the area where the tower is located, used to be the main economic center of the region during the Japanese rule of Taiwan. It was the meeting point of people to do business, thus the construction of aqueduct was imminent to sustain the activities. In 1925, the Gangshan Aqueduct was constructed and completed in 1926, a water canal and water purification system based on the Qing Dynasty style. In 1929, the expansion work was carried out due to the inadequate capacity of Gangshan Aqueduct. The Ghangshan Water Tower was then constructed and completed in April 1938. The water tower supplied water to the area until 1992 when it was decommissioned.

Transportation
The water tower is accessible within walking distance northwest of Gangshan Station of Taiwan Railways.

See also
 List of tourist attractions in Taiwan
 Water supply and sanitation in Taiwan

References

1938 establishments in Taiwan
Buildings and structures in Kaohsiung
Tourist attractions in Kaohsiung
Water towers in Taiwan